Technos may refer to:
 Technos (watches), a watch brand established 1900 in Switzerland
 Technōs Japan, a defunct Japanese video game developer, 1981–1996
 Techno Twins or The Technos, a 1980s British electronic music duo